Arturo Avilés Sosa (born April 26, 1961, in Mexico City) was a Mexican football manager and former player.

Personal life
Avilés' son, also named Arturo, is also a professional footballer.

References

External links
 LOS ESCUALOS CON NUEVO DT; ARTURO AVILÉS AL FRENTE | Liga Premier Magazine

1961 births
Living people
Footballers from Mexico City
Mexican footballers
Association football defenders
Tecos F.C. footballers
Atlante F.C. footballers
Liga MX players
Mexican football managers
Lobos BUAP managers